Alejandro Magariños Cervantes (1825–1893) was an Uruguayan writer and lawyer. He was Minister of Finance in 1869. 

1825 births
1893 deaths
Uruguayan male writers
19th-century Uruguayan lawyers
University of the Republic (Uruguay) alumni
Academic staff of the University of the Republic (Uruguay)
University of the Republic (Uruguay) rectors
Ministers of Economics and Finance of Uruguay